SEG Plaza is a skyscraper in Shenzhen, Guangdong Province, China. It was the 21st tallest in China and the 72nd tallest in the world. The observation floor at the 69th level used to offer views over Shenzhen and northern Hong Kong but has been converted to office space. It is the home of, and named after the Shenzhen Electronics Group (SEG). It can be reached by Huaqiang North Station and Huaqiang Road Station of the Shenzhen Metro.

History

Construction 
The tower comprises a steel-reinforced concrete core with external steel tube columns filled with concrete. It has four basement levels.

It was constructed for Seg Plaza Investment and Development with investment from the Shenzhen SEG Group Co. Ltd. The tower was designed by Chinese architecture firm Hua Yi Designing Consultants Limited.

2021 shaking 
On 18 May 2021, the building began to shake, leading to an emergency evacuation.

The building remained closed three days later while inspections were carried out. An initial investigation ruled out an earthquake as the cause of shaking, with the main structure of the building safe without any cracks found at the building or the surroundings.

Authorities later declared the shaking as a result of winds which caused a roof-top mast to vibrate. The mast was used for guiding aircraft and lightning protection. The mast has since been removed and replaced by an alternative structure providing the same functions. The buildings new height is currently unknown, the original mast added  to the building's height.

Floors 
There are a total of 71 stories above ground (72 when counting the helipad) and 4 stories underground. The total floor space is 170,000 square meters. The four stories underground are parking levels.

SEG Electronics Market and the main building 
The floors from the 1st floor through to the 10th floor are taken up by the SEG Electronics Market, a major market of electronics components and finished products of international importance. The names SEG Electronics Market and SEG Market are also sometimes metonymically used for the surrounding area, including other electronics markets in nearby buildings.

The 11th floor is a refuge floor. Floor M and 12th floors are European restaurants and a food supply center for the administration. Floors 13 through 69 are white-collar worker office floors (of which floors 19, 34 , 49 and 63 are emergency  equipment cabinet and shelter levels); the 70th and 71st floors are observation decks (Closed) and the 72nd floor is a helicopter landing pad.

See also 
 List of tallest buildings in Shenzhen

References

External links 
 SEG Plaza on CTBUH Skyscraper Center

Skyscraper office buildings in Shenzhen
Skyscraper hotels in Shenzhen
Buildings and structures completed in 2000
Shopping malls in Shenzhen